Günter Schaumburg (born 1 January 1943) is a German athlete. He competed in the men's discus throw at the 1968 Summer Olympics.

References

1943 births
Living people
Athletes (track and field) at the 1968 Summer Olympics
German male discus throwers
Olympic athletes of East Germany
Place of birth missing (living people)